Ed Harris is an American actor, producer, director, and screenwriter. His performances in Apollo 13 (1995), The Truman Show (1998), Pollock (2000) and The Hours (2002) earned him critical acclaim in addition to Academy Award nominations. Harris has appeared in several leading and supporting roles, such as in The Right Stuff (1983), The Abyss (1989), State of Grace (1990), Glengarry Glen Ross (1992), Nixon (1995), The Rock (1996), Stepmom (1998), A Beautiful Mind (2001), Enemy at the Gates (2001), A History of Violence (2005), Gone Baby Gone (2007), Snowpiercer (2013), and Mother! (2017). In addition to directing Pollock, Harris also directed the western Appaloosa (2008).

In television, Harris is notable for his roles as Miles Roby in the miniseries Empire Falls (2005) and as United States Senator John McCain in the television movie Game Change (2012), the latter of which earned him the Golden Globe Award for Best Supporting Actor – Series, Miniseries or Television Film. He currently stars as the Man in Black in the HBO science fiction-western series Westworld (2016–2022), for which he earned a nomination for the Primetime Emmy Award for Outstanding Lead Actor in a Drama Series.

Filmography

Film

Television

Stage

Video games

References

External links
Ed Harris at the IMDb

Male actor filmographies
American filmographies